The de Havilland Gipsy Major or Gipsy IIIA is a four-cylinder, air-cooled, inverted inline engine used in a variety of light aircraft produced in the 1930s, including the famous Tiger Moth biplane. Many Gipsy Major engines still power vintage aircraft types.

Engines were produced by de Havilland in the UK and by the Australian arm of the company, de Havilland Australia, the latter modifying the design to use imperial measures rather than the original metric measurements.

Design and development
The engine was a slightly modified Gipsy III, which was effectively a de Havilland Gipsy engine modified to run inverted so that the cylinders pointed downwards below the crankcase. The Major was also bored-out (118 mm from 114 mm) compared to the Gipsy III, increasing displacement from 5 L to 6.1 L.

The inverted configuration allowed the propeller shaft to be kept in a high position without having the cylinders blocking the pilot's forward view over the nose of the aircraft.

One initial disadvantage of the inverted configuration was the high oil consumption (up to four pints per hour) requiring regular refills of the external oil tank; this problem improved over time with the use of modified piston rings. First built in 1932, total production of all Gipsy Major versions was 14,615 units.

Further development
In 1934, when Geoffrey de Havilland needed a more powerful engine for his twin-engined transport aircraft, the four-cylinder Gipsy Major was further developed into the 200 hp six-cylinder Gipsy Six. In 1937 even more power was needed for the new D.H.91 Albatross four-engined transatlantic mailplane, and so two Gipsy Six cylinder banks were combined to form one  Gipsy Twelve 12-cylinder inverted Vee. In military service, the Gipsy Twelve became known as the Gipsy King and the Gipsy Six the Gipsy Queen.

The advent of World War II cut short all civilian flying and after the war de Havilland was too busy concentrating on jet engines to put much energy into its piston engines. The Gipsy did not go without a fight though. In Canada the Gipsy Major was the engine of choice for the DHC1 Chipmunk trainer, which replaced the Tiger Moth trainer in RAF service after the war. By then however, the Gipsy Major was eclipsed by the Blackburn Cirrus Major in Britain and the American Lycoming and Continental horizontally opposed engines abroad. (In a twist of irony, the Blackburn itself was based on Frank Halford’s old ADC Cirrus engine; Blackburn had bought the licence in 1934).

In its final supercharged form, the Gipsy Major used in helicopter applications delivered 220 hp (164 kW).

By 1945 the Gipsy Major had been cleared for a world record 1,500 hours time between overhaul (TBO), surpassing its previously held world record of 1,260 hours TBO achieved in 1943. 1,000 hours TBO had earlier been achieved in 1938.

Variants

Gipsy Major I
Gipsy Major ICHigher compression ratio (6:1) and maximum RPM for racing use.
Gipsy Major IDFuel pump added, plus screened ignition harness and priming system.
Gipsy Major IFAluminium cylinder heads, 5.25:1 compression ratio.
Gipsy Major IIVariable pitch propeller
Gipsy Major 7Military version of Gipsy Major 1D, increased climb RPM.
Gipsy Major 8Sodium cooled exhaust valves, cartridge starter for DHC Chipmunk.
Gipsy Major 10Electric starter option.
Gipsy Major 30Major redesign, bore and stroke increased. 6.5:1 compression ratio.
Gipsy Major 50Supercharged. 197 hp.
Gipsy Major 200Designed as a light helicopter engine. 200 hp.
Gipsy Major 215Turbo-supercharged helicopter engine. 220 hp.
Alfa Romeo 110Alfa Romeo licence production/derivative
de Havilland L-375-1US military designation for the Gipsy Major I
IAR 4-G1IAR licence produced in Romania

Applications

Application list from Lumsden unless otherwise noted.

Surviving engines
Many Gipsy Major engines remain in service today worldwide, in the United Kingdom alone approximately 175 de Havilland Tiger Moths were noted on the Civil Aviation Authority register in September 2011 although not all of these aircraft were airworthy.

Engines on display
Examples of the Gipsy Major are on display at the following museums:
 de Havilland Aircraft Museum
 Fleet Air Arm Museum
 Shuttleworth Collection
 Royal Air Force Museum Cosford

Specifications (Gipsy Major I)

See also

References

Notes

Bibliography

 Bransom, Alan. The Tiger Moth Story, Fourth Edition. Shrewsbury, UK: Airlife Publishing Ltd., 1991. .
 Jane's Fighting Aircraft of World War II. London. Studio Editions Ltd, 1989. 
 Lumsden, Alec. British Piston Engines and their Aircraft. Marlborough, Wiltshire: Airlife Publishing, 2003. .

External links

 Royal Air Force Museum - Gipsy Major

Gipsy Major
Air-cooled aircraft piston engines
1930s aircraft piston engines
Inverted aircraft piston engines